Aldo Capitini (23 December 1899 –  19 October 1968) was an Italian philosopher, poet, political activist, anti-fascist, and educator. He was one of the first Italians to take up and develop Mahatma Gandhi's theories of nonviolence and was known as "the Italian Gandhi".

Life

Early life, 1899–1920
Capitini was born in Perugia in 1899. His father was a municipal official and his mother a tailor. From an early age Capitini became interested in philosophy and literature. Until the age of 17 years he was interested in the Futurism and nationalists who supported intervention of Italy in World War I. From 1918–1919 he abandoned modernism and nationalism for humanitarian, pacifist and socialist causes. He was committed to the study of the Latin language and Greek literature.

Capitini was physically fragile and fell ill, discovering solidarity with those who suffered "the last". A long illness in his youth led to his religious conversion and the radical change of his political views. Of this period he said, "During World War I was a teenager, but I followed the tragedy of humanity. ... Moreover, I suffered a long painful illness and was unable to work. Thus, I understood the limitations of my activist culture in the fibres of my being, which gave paramount value to action, to violence, and to enjoyment, and I felt a deep interest in, and solidarity with, the problems of those who suffer, those who cannot act, and those who are overwhelmed. I would need to envisage a reality where suffering people were perfectly well, and not thrown on the edge of civilization, waiting for death and nothingness. This is how my religious search really started".

In 1919 he acquired the Technical Institute diploma, then, in 1924, he enrolled into the Scuola Normale Superiore di Pisa, completing his master's degree in Philosophy in 1928.

Under Fascism, 1922–1945
His encounter with Gandhi's nonviolence in the late 1920s defined his style and methods of action. He became a follower of Gandhi's nonviolence and a vegetarian.

Capitini's religious conversion did not follow the traditional course, which he eventually abandoned when the Catholic Church signed the Lateran Treaty with the Fascist dictatorship in 1929. This made Catholicism the state religion and strengthened the prestige and power of Mussolini, with the Catholic Church becoming an indirect support to his government. As a result, Capitini significantly disassociated with the Catholic Church and became even more committed to his anti-fascist activities. From then on, Capitini tried to promote the reform of religion (starting from the Catholic, expanding to other denominations), with the aim of religion focussing on persons and their needs. He proposed that all religions should go beyond their dogmatism and their authoritarian structure to be at the service of marginalized people and those who had no voice in society.

In 1930, he began working as a Secretary at the Scuola Normale Superiore di Pisa. He became close to anti-Fascist students, as a professor being a conscientious objector. In 1933 the director of the Scuola Normale Superiore di Pisa, the philosopher and Fascist intellectual Giovanni Gentile, asked Capitini to join the Fascist Party. Capitini refused and was dismissed.

He then applied himself to nonviolent non-cooperation. In order to survive, he returned to his family in Perugia, where he undertook private lessons until the end of World War II in 1945. Capitini adopted the propagation of anti-Fascism as an important personal commitment from 1933 to 1943. To achieve this he met with groups of young people, especially in central Italy. This activity was facilitated by the publication of three books on philosophy and religion. The books were able to pass Fascist censorship because of the ambiguity of their titles, which addressed religious themes. Their publication was supported by the liberal philosopher Benedetto Croce, who, even though in disagreement with the Fascist regime, enjoyed a certain degree of freedom because of his international reputation.

Capitini was imprisoned twice for five months for his anti-fascist activities from 1942 to 1943.

In July 1944, with Emma Thomas (an English Quaker), Capitini founded the Centro di Orientamento Sociale (Centre for Social Orientation). The Centre began its activities in Perugia with free discussions open to all, about local issues problems and national and international political and economic problems. It was successful and spread to other cities, including Ferrara, Florence, Bologna, Lucca, Arezzo, Ancona, Assisi and Naples, but it failed to establish itself permanently because of the indifference of the Left and the hostility of the Christian Democratic Party.

Post-war, 1946–1968

Capitini, despite his anti-fascist efforts, did not want to be part of the Cold War division of the world, mainly because he did not share many of the aspects of these two world views. He therefore remained isolated and was not able to play an institutional role in the nascent Italian Republic. Nevertheless, from the end of World War II until his death, he was involved in a number of important areas: religious, civil, social and political. Furthermore, he promoted Social Guidance Centres, the Movement of Religion, the Italian Vegetarian Society, and the Association for the Protection and Development of Public Schools. Additionally he became the most important exponent of nonviolence in Italy. In particular, he organized the creation of associations, groups, magazines, national events, public meetings, seminars and conferences.

In 1946, he arranged the first meeting on religious problems at that time. Representatives of different currents of religious, political, social, religious scholars, and free researchers were involved. With this conference, he wanted to examine the Italian situation and to find a synthesis between social and religious life. In 1947, he held a second seminar, always with the same issues. In the same year, he also held a third symposium. As a result of these important meetings, the Religious Movement was established. Its aim was the struggle for religious freedom in Italy, the promotion of conferences; an association of ex-priests to assist those in difficulty to the discrimination of the Church; and publishing and distribution of books and pamphlets on religious problems. In 1948, the Religious Movement held the first Italian congress for religious reform in Rome.

In 1950, Capitini organized the first Italian conference in Rome on the subject of conscientious objection.

Capitini attended the World Congress of Religions for Peace Foundation, held in London in 1950. He proposed the establishment of a Nonviolent Religious International Movement; nevertheless the suggestion was not accepted. He protested against the appeal made by the meeting to religious leaders, saying that leaders are responsible for compromise of states and wars, and that the Congress had to address directly appeal to people individually.

Capitini participated in the Congress of Vedanta in London in 1951. The theme was "Peace, unity of the world, the spiritual community".

In January 1952, Capitini promoted an International Conference for Nonviolence in Perugia. At the end of the meeting, he created an International Coordinating Center for Nonviolence. In the same year he held another conference in Perugia to study nonviolence with respect to plant and animal life. The outcome of the conference was the creation of the Italian Vegetarian Society, with Capitini as President and based in Perugia. The vegetarian society became a collective effort after twenty years based on Capitini's personal wishes. However, forty years after his death, the Vegetarian Society continues its activities in the same way, the only difference being its change in name to the Italian Vegetarian Association.

In 1953, Capitini also held the first West-East Asia Conference in Perugia. The aim of the meeting was to highlight the similarities between Asia and western countries, especially from nonviolence perspective. Therefore, the effort was to avoid repeating the mistakes of a history of oppression, conquests and wars. In 1954, Capitini held a seminar of lectures and discussions on the methodology of Gandhi in Perugia.

He became a professor of pedagogy at the University of Cagliari in 1956 and in 1965 granted a transfer to the University of Perugia with the same chair.

In 1961, with the help of other political forces of the Left, Capitini promoted a 24 km March for Peace and the Brotherhood of Peoples from Perugia to Assisi in 1961, in the context of international tension. Its purpose was to state the wish that 'peace is prepared in time of peace' and to awaken this awareness in public opinion. The event, held in September, was successful and was attended by thousands of people. The success of the March convinced the promoters of the need for continued collaboration in the commitment for peace. The march has been repeated many times since 1961, the most recent in 2011, 50 years after the first one.

Out of the 1961 march, a federation of associations and peoples was born, giving life to the Italian Advisory Council for Peace, Capitini was appointed as President. Nonviolent people, who also participated in it, constituted their own independent group: the Nonviolent Movement for Peace, Secretary Capitini. Capitini organized the National Conference on Disarmament Affairs in Florence in 1962, and held a seminar on techniques of nonviolence in Perugia in 1963, with the participation of leaders of the Committee of 100.

Inspired by the peace flags used on British peace marches, Capitini got some women of Perugia hurriedly to sew together coloured strips of material for the 1961 peace march. The use of the flag became widespread with the Pace da tutti i balconi ("Peace from every balcony") campaign in 2002, a protest against the impending war in Iraq and is now used by peace organizations throughout the world. In 2003, the Italian newspaper Corriere della Sera reported the opinion of leading advertising executives that it had become more popular than the Italian national flag. The original flag was kept by Capitini's collaborator, Dr. Lanfranco Mencaroni, at Collevalenza, near Todi. In 2011, plans were announced to transfer it to the Palazzo dei Priori in Perugia.

At the 12th Congress of War Resisters' International in Rome in 1966, Capitini gave a paper on International nonviolence and permanent revolution. Two meetings in Perugia were the first congresses of the Nonviolent Movement for Peace. Capitini introduced a report, on the attempts of political, and social revolution, favoring the method of violence and thinking to transform society by the simple grabbing of power. He tried to prove that a nonviolent revolution is much more effective and lasting, partly because it avoids the risks and distortions of the authoritarian practices related to violence.

Capitini promoted A.D.E.S.S.P.I. (Associazione per la difesa e lo sviluppo della scuola pubblica italiana [Association for the protection and development of the Italian public school]). This association was launched to defend and promote the rights of everyone to an education. In particular, the Association defended the freedom of teaching by attempting to make formal education similar to the confessional. To achieve this, the Association was the guarantor and controller of legislative and administrative power. The Association was a very active and efficient in pursuing its goals and Capitini was very active supporter and promoter of the initiatives.

Among those people he engaged were Danilo Dolci (a social activist, sociologist, popular educator and poet, known for his opposition against poverty, social exclusion and the Mafia in Sicily), and Lorenzo Milani (a priest and educator known for his civic education of the poor, and for his fight against injustice and violence).

Capitini died on 19 October 1968 following the after-effects of surgery.

Ideas

Although Capitini remained a religious man his belief were counter-current to the institutional Church who condemned him and his books. The Catholic Church began a complex process of change and openness to the world with the Second Vatican Council (1962 to 1965); however Capitini was not able to see the fruits of this change, dying a few years later. However, in relation to its vision of 'open religion', the most significant and important innovations introduced by the Catholic Church appeared to him to be timid. The philosophical and religious thoughts of his training were based on, the results from the meeting with Claudio Baglietto (philosopher, and conscientious objector who died in exile in Switzerland), and some components that Fortuna defined in his essay to be integral parts of the Kantian criticism (for the primacy of the moral law), idealism (Hegel, Benedetto Croce, Giovanni Gentile), Marxian analysis and Gandhian spirituality. To these elements, the political scientist and philosopher Norberto Bobbio (1984) added the influence of Giacomo Leopardi (poet and writer) and Giuseppe Mazzini (politician and philosopher). Capitini, as he wrote in his 'Letters of Religion', published posthumously in the book The Power of All, to escape the trap of traditional religions and to form his own ideas of religion and inspiration for his deeds, he was forced to go back 'to the teachers of religious life'. that he identified with Jesus Christ, Buddha, St. Francis of Assisi, Gandhi and Mazzini. For Capitini, it was necessary that the religious dimension of each person was translated into concrete action in public life. His engagement in politics was always astute and constant, while not wishing to have any specific affiliations with political parties. The first example was his rejection of the fascist card and then his fight against Fascism. At the end of the World War II, he wrote the Manifesto of the Liberal Socialism, together with the philosopher and political scientist Guido Calogero. Their effort was to combine the best ideas of the liberal school with those of socialism.

While he did not choose the path of party politics Capitini undertook an intense political life, gaining experience at the Centre for Social Orientation (CSO) and by making decisions in the field of education and pedagogy for a free and non-confessional public school. The author of this essay considered the most original contribution of Capitini to society and to the intellectual world that he attended, was the concept of 'open religion'. It was an idea so cool and innovative to be rejected and regarded with suspicion from the beginning. With the concept of 'open religion' the philosopher of Perugia wanted to introduce radical changes to the dogmas and practices of traditional religions, and wished to build bridges between Western philosophy and Eastern schools of thought (especially Buddhism). Finally, Capitini wanted to transform society by focussing on the spiritual and material needs of persons, also taking into account their libertarian and egalitarian pressures. Nonviolence is the main instrument of change, becoming a lever of social change in the path of improvement that does not exclude anyone.

For Capitini, the nonviolence that he put into practice was a product derived from this religious aspiration. Capitini recognized the re-establishment of religion to be an important historical problem, then taking this as a key point of nonviolence. He did not want to empty the religious institutions, but wanted to overcome them instead, re-establishing full consciousness so that politics could be understood as a religious act. His reform of religion was addressed to political action both at a personal and society level. In light of these considerations it is possible to claim that there types of nonviolence exist, 'religious' and 'secular'. Religious nonviolence can be understood as a lifestyle. It is an opening to existence, freedom, development of all people, opposition to oppression and destruction, and as final point it is active resistance. A way of being and living in relationships with others who, before becoming valuable as social action (external to us), must penetrate into our consciousness and be part of us. Meanwhile, secular nonviolence can be understood to be a pragmatic choice to resolve conflicts. Nonviolence becomes an effective method that provides better results, or less damage than, those of violent acts. In this case, the 'minimum' requirement is fulfillment of the two cornerstones of nonviolence: not to use physical violence, nor to offend the dignity of others for the duration of the conflict. In the former, the attitude is related more to the idea of nonviolence expressed by Capitini and Gandhi, in the latter it is possible to identify the contributions of Western scholars, in fact, in the Western academic approach there is the idea of observing the connections between nonviolence and power (the analysis to obtain and maintain power).

The Manifesto of Liberal Socialism was outlined by the philosopher Calogero in 1940. In this manifesto, Calogero collected the ideas of opposition to Fascism by Capitini and other intellectuals. Overlapping with social liberalism, Capitini and Calogero sought to join the best elements of liberalism and socialism in liberal socialism (liberalsocialismo). They combined freedom and justice to provide a remarkable insight that could overcome Marxist socialism and reactionary liberalism. The Liberal Socialism movement decided to give him a party ticket, in contrast Capitini decided not to join the party, because he wanted it to perform political lobbying.

Capitini's development of nonviolence

In the history of nonviolence in Italy, Capitini was the main protagonist, being defined as 'the Italian Gandhi'. Capitini approached nonviolence in the late twenties and in 1931 Gandhi visited Italy for a few days. Capitini drew many lessons from Gandhian philosophy; he developed an overarching perspective where nonviolence became the source of inspiration for many of its activities and achievements. His work was also inspired by the concept of persuasion and openness. For Capitini the term persuasion, in the sense of complete conviction, indicated faith, and the deep belief in certain values and commitments. He believed that individual acts, according to the criteria of its profound consciousness, can create value and find something that is worth more than material existence and formal spirituality.

Persuasion, a word which Capitini took from the philosopher Carlo Michelstaedter of Gorizia, is the ability to pursue one's own ideals with tenacity, and the power of nonviolence, a gentle power, however determined. The opening is the opposite of the conservative and authoritarian vision of Fascism; it is the elevation of the soul toward God. For Capitini, individuals have to open to 'all human beings, to all people, even to things'. In some way, he wished that society, the Church and, traditions were opened up to a dimension of freedom and a gift to all. First of all, through the idea of nonviolent non-cooperation he found the strength to refuse the card for entry to the fascist party, losing his job at the University. Initially he developed the concept of omnicracy, the power for all, meaning that each person has the right to participate in government and control of public power through meetings, assemblies, and meetings with politicians and those who held institutional roles. These meetings had to be public, informing people what was happening and what decisions were being taken.

In 1948, Pietro Pinna listened to Capitini at a conference sponsored by the Movement of Religion in Ferrara. In the aftermath of that occurrence, Pinna matured his choice of conscientious objection. He was the first post-war objector. Pinna underwent a first process and a first conviction in 1949 and served Capitini as testimony in his favor. Capitini mobilized to help young Pinna to his choice of conscientious objection. For this initiative Capitini called on the support of his intellectual friends and Members of the Italian Parliament.

The role of religion in Capitini's work

His key religious ideas were:

co-presence,
open religion,
you-all people,
'free addition', and
non-mendacity.

Capitini identifies the idea of co-presence in the value of all, together. However this does not negate personal individuality, instead to be together embraces each creature and saves them, bringing them towards the full realization of the good. Moreover, in the co-presence next to the dead are the live, engaged in one enterprise to overcome the logic of violence. Capitini wanted that reality to become a space of freedom for everybody. Co-presence needs to be implemented together with all beings, living or not, to create values and freedom from all violence and evil. To do this, all institutions and philosophies must be open. Religion is no exception to this rule, or rather religion, especially the Catholic religion, must be open to people in a free and selfless way, because every being is ‘sacred’, every being deserves love and absolute respect. The act of faith is therefore a free act, an open giving. Consequently, there is no need for an institution to serve as a means for salvation. Capitini "testifies the superficiality of any institution wishing to present itself as a gateway". It follows that in an open religion perspective, the distinction between priests and ordinary believers does not make sense, because God will enter the lives of everyone. Capitini’s prophetic religion radically refutes traditional religion and designates it as a new reality achieved through concrete actions.

According to the insights of Capitini, traditional religions need to be rethought and reformed deeply. He identifies four main reasons to understand with a reasonable likelihood because religions have lost their aptitude to be innovative and must radically transform to society and mankind:

a) many facts that constituted the historical basis of religion have proved to be incorrect;

b) many ideas, deemed to be central and fundamental rules, have not proved to be the most feasible and practicable,

c) the essence of religion is no longer considered the adherence to formal rituals and loyalty to the institutions in their crystallized power;

d) religions rather than being prophetic and playing a role in social change, have often proved to be a prop of the established power and an element of conservation, both in social and political patterns.

The concept of "free addition" indicates the difference with traditional religions. Open religion is drawing nearer to people. It is a spontaneous gift, a giving of oneself from within and thus free gift and pure offer. With the concept of "free addition" Capitini adds value, a positive trend, an improvement to human life from the persons closest to him. The religious life of Capitini is a life open to you-all, where it is possible to meet God through ‘you’. God is open to all and creates a relationship. Thus, people and all beings can build a journey of justice and freedom in daily life. In this path, nonviolence and non-lie (no lies about peoples' intentions or actions) are the means to foster this new religiosity effectively.

Capitini was one of the first scholars in Italy to understand the significance of relations between East and West. He was probably favoured in this comprehension from having adhered to the idea of nonviolence introduced by Gandhi. In the religious thoughts of Capitini there are many references to Buddhist philosophy. The scholar Vigilante states, in his paper, that there are many similarities between Capitini religiosity, and Buddhism. Capitini lived the experience of suffering as the way to religious conversion. Suffering in Buddhism is a significant feature of the four 'noble truths'. Furthermore, Buddhists view the subject as unthinkable outside of a relational situation with the entire system of living beings. The Buddhist world is interdependent, living beings are interconnected and the salvation of each is possible only with the salvation of others. The respect for life, all life forms, and the desire not to hurt others are also important. Buddhism is aware that the reality is very different from what it ought to be; however mankind has the resources (internal and otherwise) to meet the challenges of reality. Capitini is fully within this vision, it is the vision of nonviolent commitment. Finally, Buddhism has two relevant features for Capitini: a) it teaches universal brotherhood, the attention to the suffering and the equality of all living beings, b) Buddhism is a religion that is not based on authority or on the divinity of its founder, but the effectiveness of its teachings. The latter point ties together theory and practice, thereby Buddhism was a fertile ground for reflection and action of the philosopher from Perugia.

Assessments of his life

Of Capitini, Fortuna said "it is enough to give a rapid glance at the titles of Capitini's books and see how many times the words 'religion', 'religiosity' and 'religious' appear to realize that such an insistence not only cannot be random, but testifies to the fundamental and decisive option." Without religious motivation Capitini would not have been pushed so hard to act in the social and political life. Nonviolence, and non-cooperation are the means he used to achieve his goals of social change and religious innovation.

Capitini did not enter into the mechanism of political parties; in a bipolar Italian system (communism vs. capitalism) he did not take sides, defining himself as a 'left-wing independent', actively engaging in politics. It was never an indifference, according to the negative definition given to that term by Antonio Gramsci. He was opposed and condemned by the traditional Catholic Church, and was regarded as a utopian dreamer for his idea of nonviolence and for his insight to tackle conflicts through nonviolence. Of him Bobbio said, '"that was a Gandhian in the land of Machiavelli, a religious heretic in the land of the Counter Reformation (and the associated indifference), a pacifist, religious, and moreover, in a country where a tradition of thought and action pacifist has never existed, "even to the point that the "great slaughter" of the first Italy in World War II caused "feelings of nonviolent tremors' comparable to occurring in the European context'.

There is a great consistency of thought with the personal life of Capitini. Moreover, within Capitini exists a vaster intuition and a greater and more perfect vision of the needs of mankind. The discovery of nonviolence makes this an unbeatable view of finding the means for its realization. These instruments are perfectly in line with his philosophy and his way of seeing things. From this was born a fruitful 'marriage' of dozens of initiatives, publications, and writings. His commitment involved many people, associations, and groups. On his ability to act, he generated new patterns of comparison, analysis and action. The most striking demonstration of the validity of his significant commitment is demonstrated by the legacy he left. Forty-three years after his death, the Italian Nonviolent Movement is still in existence, the Nonviolent Action magazine and his meaningful insights are still valid today, being able to draw the attention of scholars and intellectuals who have the expertise to fully assess Capitini's legacy. In addition, there has been a wide spread of nonviolence and its methods, and in Italy the first degree-oriented peace research, was established by the University of Pisa and Florence in the academic year 2001–2002. On the other hand, it must be said that civil Italian society still has to acknowledge the idea of nonviolence as an operational tool for conflict transformation, in order to become an overwhelming majority, and the route of religious change remains very long and difficult. On the whole Capitini has made a significant and real contribution to the development of nonviolence, starting from its condition of 'free religious' and this commitment has not disappeared. The socialist politician Pietro Nenni said a short sentence, it summarizes in a clear, effective and illuminating manner the uniqueness, diversity and commitment of Capitini. On the death of Capitini he wrote: '… Aldo Capitini was counter-current during the time of Fascism and then again in the post-Fascism era. Maybe it is too much for one human life, however beautiful it is’.

Writings
1937 Elementi di un'esperienza religiosa, (Elements of a Religious Experience, Outlined his religious philosophy and presented the theoretical foundations of the principles of nonviolence.), Laterza, Bari.
1942 Vita religiosa, Cappelli, Bologna.
1943 Atti della presenza aperta, Sansoni, Firenze.
1947 Saggio sul soggetto della storia, La Nuova Italia, Firenze.
1948 Esistenza e presenza del soggetto in Atti del Congresso internazionale di Filosofia (II Vol.), Castellani, Milano.
1948 La realtà di tutti, Arti Grafiche Tornar, Pisa.
1948 Religious Problems Today
1949 Italia nonviolenta, (Nonviolent Italy), Libreria Internazionale di Avanguardia, Bologna.
1950 Nuova socialità e riforma religiosa, (New Social Relations and Religious Reform), Einaudi, Torino.
1951 L'atto di educare, La Nuova Italia, Firenze.
1955 Religione aperta, (Open Religion), Guanda, Modena.
1956 Colloquio corale, Pacini Mariotti, Pisa.
1956 Open Revolution
1957 I Argue the Religion of Pius XXII
1958 Aggiunta religiosa all'opposizione, Parenti, Firenze.
1958 Danilo Dolci on nonviolence
1958 The experience of Danilo Dolci
1959 Conscientious Objection in Italy
1961 Battezzati non credenti, (Non-Believing Baptized), Parenti, Firenze.
1962 On the Road to Peace
1962 Nonviolence Today
1964 Founded the magazine Nonviolent Action, which became the official organ of the Nonviolent Movement.
1964 Civic Education in School and Social Life
1965 Religious Life
1967 Le tecniche della nonviolenza, (The Techniques of Nonviolence), Feltrinelli, Milano (rist. Linea D'Ombra, Milano 1989).
1967–1968 Educazione aperta (2 Vols.), (Open Education), La Nuova Italia, Firenze.
n.d. Letters of Religion An anthology of sixty-three letters written from 1951 to 1968.
1969 Il potere di tutti, introduzione di N. Bobbio, prefazione di P. Pinna, La Nuova Italia, Firenze.
1992 Scritti sulla nonviolenza, a cura di L. Schippa, Protagon, Perugia
1994 Scritti filosofici e religiosi, a cura di M. Martini, Protagon, Perugia
2004 Le ragioni della nonviolenza. Antologia degli scritti, a cura di M. Martini, Ets, Pisa
2007 Lettere 1931–1968, "Epistolario di Aldo Capitini, 1" – con Walter Binni, a cura di L. Binni e L. Giuliani, Carocci, Roma
2008 Lettere 1952–1968, "Epistolario di Aldo Capitini, 2" – con Danilo Dolci, a cura di G. Barone e S. Mazzi, Carocci, Roma
2009 Lettere 1936–1968, "Epistolario di Aldo Capitini, 3" – con Guido Calogero, a cura di Th. Casadei e G. Moscati, Carocci, Roma
 He also founded a monthly magazine of national circulation, entitled The Power of All based on citizen participation in power and the means and methods available to citizens for the control of institutions from below.

References
Bergagna, L. (1968) Incontro con il Gandhi Italiano(Meeting the Italian Gandhi). La Stampa 22 June 3
Capitini, A. (1969) Il Potere di Tutti' (The Power of All) Florence: La Nuova Italia
Capitini, A. (1990) Elementi di un'Esperienza Religiosa, Ristampa Anastatica, Edizione del 1947 (Elements of a Religious Experience. Reprint Edition, 1947). Bologna: Cappelli editore
Eurostudium (2005) Primo Manifesto del Liberalsocialismo (First Manifesto of Liberal Socialism) (21 February 2011)
Fortuna, M. (2002) Religione Cristiana e Religione Aperta: Linee di un Confronto (Christian Religion and Open Religion: a Comparison of Lines). Segni e Comprensioni (Signs and Understandings) XVI n.s. (47), 17–39
Gramsci, A. (n.d.) La Città Futura. Indifferenti [The Future Town. Indifferent] [18 March 2011]
Mercurelli, C. (2008–2009) Guido Calogero, Aldo Capitini, Norberto Bobbio. Tre Idee di Democrazia per Tre Proposte di Pace [Guido Calogero, Aldo Capitini, Norberto Bobbio. Three Ideas of Democracy for Three Proposals for Peace] Unpublished thesis. Milan: University of Milan
Movimento Nonviolento (Nonviolent Movement) (n.d.) Aldo Capitini  (21 February 2011)
National Association of Friends of Aldo Capitini (Associazione Nazionale 'Amici di Aldo Capitini') (1968) Parola di Aldo Capitini. Attraverso Due Terzi del Secolo. Autobiografia  (Words of Aldo Capitini. Through Two-Thirds of the Century. Autobiography) (19 February 2011)
Nenni, P. (1983) I Conti con la Storia. Diari 1967–1971 [To Terms with History. Diaries 1967–1971] (3 vols.). Milan: Sugarco Edizioni
Pisu, R. (2006) "Abito Indecente", e il Papa non lo Volle Ricevere (“Indecent Dress”, and the Pope did not Wish to Receive Gandhi). La Repubblica'', 18 June 1943
Ufficio Nazionale per il Servizio Civile (National Bureau for Civil Service) (n.d.) Alcune Date Salienti della Storia dell'Obiezione di Coscienza (Some Key Dates in the History of Conscientious Objection)(online) available from (26 February 2011)

Further reading
Appleby, R.S. (2000) The Ambivalence of the Sacred: Religion, Violence and Reconciliation. Lanham: Rowman & Littlefield
Associazione Nazionale ‘Amici di Aldo Capitini’ [National Association ‘Friends Aldo Capitini’] (ed.) (2010)
Il Pensiero e le Opere di Aldo Capitini nella Coscienza delle Nuove Generazioni [Thought and Works of Aldo Capitini in the Consciousness of the New Generations]
'Atti della I Giornata dei Giovani Studiosi Capitiniani' [Proceedings of the First Day of Young Capitini's Scholars]. held 14 March 2009 at Perugia. Bari: Levante editori
Bobbio, N. (1984) Religion and Politics in Aldo Capitini [online] available from < http://www.aldocapitini.it/englishversion/absing.htm > [8 March 2011]
Capitini, A. (1985) Vita Religiosa [Religious Life]. Bologna: Cappelli editore
Capitini, A. (1967) Le Tecniche della Nonviolenza [The Techniques of Nonviolence]. Milano: Libreria Feltrinelli
Capitini, A. (1961) Battezzati Non Credenti [Non-Believers Baptized]. Firenze: Parenti
Capitni, A. (1957) Discuto la Religione di Pio XXII [I Argue the Religion of Pius XXII]. Milano: Parenti
Capitini, A. (1955) Religione Aperta [Open Religion]. Guanda: Parma
Capitini, A. (1950) Nuova Socialità e Riforma Religiosa [New Social Relations and Religious Reform]. Torino: Einaudi
Capitini, A. (1948) Il Problema Religioso Attuale [Religious Problem Today]. Guanda: Parma
Capitini (n.d.) Letters of Religion [online] available from <https://web.archive.org/web/20111126035323/http://www.aldocapitini.it/letterereligione/base9.htm> [2 March 2011]
Centro Documentazione di Pistoia [Documentation Center of Pistoia] (2009) Aldo Capitini. Pensieri, Opere, Attualità [Aldo *Capitini. Thoughts, Works, Relevance Today] [online] available from <http://www.antimoderati.it/index.php?option=com_content&view=article&id=12&Itemid=14 > [28 February 2011]
Drago, A. (2002) 'Aldo Capitini Riformatore Religioso-Politico. Venti Tesi' ['Aldo Capitini Religious and Political Reformer. Twenty Thesis']. in Soccio, M. (ed.) 'Convertirsi alla Nonviolenza? Credenti e Non Credenti si Interrogano su Laicità, Religione, Nonviolenza' [Convert to Nonviolence? Believers and Non-Believers Wonder about Secularism, Religion, Nonviolence']. held 11 June 2002 at Perugia. San Pietro in Cariano Verona: Il Segno dei Gabrielli editori, 125–139
Foppa Pedretti, C. (2005) Spirito Profetico ed Educazione in Aldo Capitini [Spirit of Prophecy and Education in Aldo Capitini]. Milano: Vita e Pensiero
Harris, I. (2010) ‘Book Review: The Nonviolent Revolution: The Italian who Embraced Gandhi’s Satyagraha to Oppose Fascism and War, An Intellectual Biography of Aldo Capitini’. Peace Studies Journal 3 (2), 82–84
Marescotti, A., and Marescotti, D. (2005) Storia della Pace e della Nonviolenza. L’Altra Storia. L’Opposizione alle Guerre e alla Violenza dall’Antichita’ ad Oggi [History of Peace and Nonviolence. The Other Story. Opposition to War and Violence, from Ancient Times to Today] [online] 2nd edn. Taranto: Peacelink. available from <http://www.peacelink.it/storia/a/2707.html> [5 February 2011]
Martini, M. (2004) Le Ragioni della Nonviolenza. Antologia degli Scritti di Aldo Capitini[The Reasons of Nonviolence. Anthology of the Writings of Aldo Capitini]. Pisa: Ets (Philosophica)
Michelstaedter, C. (2004) Persuasion and Rhetoric. trans. by, Valentino, R.S., Sartini Blum, C., and Depew, D.J. New Haven: Yale University Press
National Association ‘Friends Aldo Capitini’ [Associazione Nazionale ‘Amici di Aldo Capitini’] (n.d.) Scheda Bio-Bibliografica di Aldo Capitini. Vita e Opere di Aldo Capitini. [Biographical and Bibliographical Dossier. Life and Works of Aldo Capitini] [online] available from <http://www.aldocapitini.it/notizie/base3.htm > [26 February 2011]
National Association 'Friends Aldo Capitini' [Associazione Nazionale 'Amici di Aldo Capitini'] (n.d.) Motivi e Necessità di una Riforma Religiosa. [Reasons and the Need for Religious Reform] [online] available from <http://www.aldocapitini.it/percorso/base2.htm > [5 March 2011]
Pastena, P. (2005) Breve Storia del Pacifismo in Italia [Brief History of Pacifism in Italy]. Palermo: Bonanno
Peyretti, E. (1999) Aldo Capitini: l'Idea di una Religione Aperta [Aldo Capitini: the Idea of an Open Religion] [online] available from <http://www.peacelink.it/storia/a/9868.html> [11 February 2011]
Sardonini, L. (1988–89) Antimilitarismo nell'Italia Repubblicana. Tendenze e Movimenti [Anti-Militarism in Italy. Trends and Movements]. Unpublished thesis. Bologna: University of Bologna
Smith, H. (1991) The World's Religions. New-York: HarperCollins
Vigilante, A. (2010) ‘Compresenza e Vacuità. Una Lettura Buddhista di Aldo Capitini’ [‘Compresence and Emptiness. A Buddhist Reading of Aldo Capitini’]. in Moscati, G. (ed.) Il Pensiero e le Opere di Aldo Capitini nella Coscienza delle Nuove Generazioni [Thought and Works of Aldo Capitini in the Consciousness of the New Generations] 'Atti della I Giornata dei Giovani Studiosi Capitiniani' [Proceedings of the First Day of Young Capitini's Scholars]. held 14 March 2009 at Perugia. Bari: Levante editori, 53–77
Vigilante, A. (2000) Religione e Nonviolenza in Aldo Capitini [Religion and Nonviolence in Aldo Capitini] 'Conference on Nonviolenza e Religione'[Nonviolence and Religion]. held 23 September 2000 at Perugia. [online] available from <http://nonviolenti.org/cms/index.php?page=aldo-capitini#c > [5 March 2011]

External links

 Antonino Drago, A Profile of the Italian Non-Violent Aldo Capitini (1899–1968) 
 International Vegetarian Union (IVU): History of Italian Vegetarian Societies

1899 births
1968 deaths
20th-century Italian male writers
20th-century Italian philosophers
20th-century Italian politicians
20th-century Italian writers
Action Party (Italy) politicians
Italian anti-fascists
Italian pacifists
Italian vegetarianism activists
Nonviolence advocates
Social philosophers